Egypt and Indonesia established diplomatic relations in 1947. Both are Muslim-majority countries with significant non-Muslim minorities. Indonesia has an embassy in Cairo and Egypt has an embassy in Jakarta. Both countries are members of the Organisation of Islamic Cooperation, Non-Aligned Movement, the G20 developing nations and Developing 8 Countries. Egypt was also the first sovereign country to recognise Indonesia's independence; doing so in 1946, three years before its formal, internationally-recognised independence date.

In 2020, the value of trade between the two countries reached . Indonesian exports to Egypt include crude palm oil, coffee, tea, textiles and electronic devices among other things. In 2014, Indonesia's exports' rate rose by 21.71 percent to a value of $1.34 billion. Egypt's exports to Indonesia, on the other hand, have reached $94.4 million in 2013 and included minerals, cement and fruits among others.

See also
Egypt and the Non-Aligned Movement

References

External links
Embassy of Egypt in Jakarta - Indonesia

 
Indonesia
Egypt